Aleksandar Ilić (born 26 June 1969) is a Serbian professional football coach and former player who is the head coach of the Lebanon national team.

Playing career
In 1999, Ilić was loaned out to Cádiz. He signed for SBV Vitesse in January 2004.

Managerial career
In January 2022, Ilić was appointed head coach of Al-Qadsiah. He became head coach of the Lebanon national team on 3 August 2022.

Career statistics

Managerial

Honours

Player
Club Brugge
 Belgian First Division: 1997–98
 Belgian Cup: 1995-96
 Belgian Super Cup: 1996, 1998

Anderlecht
 Belgian First Division: 2000–01
 Belgian Super Cup: 2000, 2001

Manager
Al-Ahli
 King Cup of Champions: 2011

Radnički Niš
 Serbian First League: 2011–12

Al-Shorta
 Iraqi Super Cup: 2019

References

External links
 https://web.archive.org/web/20090305093729/http://www.zerodic.com/autor/fudbal_1945-1992/igraci/igraci_i.htm 
 http://www.vi.nl/Spelers/Speler/AleksandarIlic.htm 
 http://www.juznevesti.com/Sport/Aleksandar-Ilic-novi-trener-Radnickog.sr.html

1969 births
Living people
Yugoslav footballers
Serbian footballers
Serbian expatriate footballers
Red Star Belgrade footballers
FK Radnički Niš players
Cádiz CF players
Paniliakos F.C. players
Club Brugge KV players
R.S.C. Anderlecht players
SBV Vitesse players
R.W.D.M. Brussels F.C. players
Yugoslav First League players
Segunda División players
Belgian Pro League players
Eredivisie players
Expatriate footballers in Spain
Expatriate footballers in Greece
Expatriate footballers in Belgium
Expatriate footballers in the Netherlands
Association football defenders
Al-Ahli Saudi FC managers
Al-Raed FC managers
Al-Shorta SC managers
Al-Qadisiyah FC managers
Lebanon national football team managers
Expatriate football managers in Saudi Arabia
Expatriate football managers in Lebanon
Serbian expatriate sportspeople in Saudi Arabia
Serbian expatriate sportspeople in Lebanon
Serbian football managers
Saudi Professional League managers
Saudi First Division League managers
Serbian expatriate football managers